Arisa's Favorite: T.K. Songs is the second compilation album by Japanese recording artist Arisa Mizuki, released through Nippon Columbia on November 27, 1996. The twelve-track set is a collection of songs written and produced by Tetsuya Komuro, selected from Mizuki's past albums and singles. The compilation is Mizuki's last album on which she is credited as Arisa Mizuki.

The Komuro-produced "Promise to Promise," which was released four months prior to the compilation was included on the album in the form of a remix. The original version, which peaked at number 17 on the Oricon Weekly Singles chart, selling over 140,000 copies and becoming Mizuki's first single to enter the top twenty since "Dakishimete!" (1995), was later included on Mizuki's third compilation album Fiore II.

CDJournal described the Arisa's Favorite: T.K. Songs as an album that "traces the growth of Mizuki and the evolution of Komuro's sound." The compilation debuted at number 19 on the Oricon Weekly Albums chart with 21,950 copies in its first week, becoming her first album in three years to debut in the top twenty, since Fiore, and overall fourth and last album to do so.

Commercial performance 
Arisa's Favorite: T.K. Songs debuted on the Oricon Weekly Albums chart at number 19 with 21,950 copies sold in its first week. The album fell eleven spots to number 30 on its second week, selling 10,130 copies, before dropping out of the top thirty the following week. The album charted for four weeks and has sold a total of 43,180 copies.

Track listing

Charts and sales

References 

1996 greatest hits albums
Alisa Mizuki albums
Nippon Columbia albums
Japanese-language albums